Jono may refer to:

Places 
Jōno Station (JR Kyushu), a railway station in Kokura Minami-ku, Kitakyushu, Japan
Jōno Station (Kitakyushu Monorail), a Monorail station in  Japan

Fictional characters 
Jono (Star Trek)
Jono (Hollyoaks)

People with the name 
Jono Bacon (born 1979)
Jono Beech (born 1990),  Australian rules footballer
Jono Boult (born 1985), New Zealand cricketer
Jono Broome, British paracanoeist who has competed since the late 2000s
Jono Carroll (born 1992), Irish boxer
Jono Dorr (born 1990), American singer, songwriter, multi-instrumentalist and record producer
Jono Gibbes (born 1977), current director of rugby at La Rochelle
Jono Grant (born 1969), Canadian composer, producer and multi-instrumentalist
Jono Hickey (born 1991), New Zealand sportsman who currently represents in cricket and rugby union
Jono Howard, Canadian-born writer who works primarily on animated children's shows
Jono Jenkins (born 1986), Asutralian rugby union footballer
Jono Jumamoy (born 1986), Philippine politician
Jono Kitto (born 1992), New Zealand rugby union player
Jono Lance (born 1990), Australian rugby union player
Jono Lester (born 1989), New Zealand racing driver
Jono Macbeth (born 1973), New Zealand yachtsman
Jono McLean (born 1980), South African cricketer
Jono Naylor (born 1960s), New Zealand politician
Jono Owen (born 1986), rugby union player
Jono Porter (1981–2004)
Jono Pryor (born 1981), New Zealand radio and television personality
Jono Ross (born 1990), South African rugby union player
Jono van Hazel (born 1978), Australian swimmer

See also 
 
 Johno (disambiguation)